John Bray (born 18 January 1938) is a New Zealand cricketer. He played in five first-class matches for Wellington from 1958 to 1967.

See also
 List of Wellington representative cricketers

References

External links
 

1938 births
Living people
New Zealand cricketers
Wellington cricketers
Cricketers from Wellington City